Kojii Helnwein (born 8 January 1981) is an Irish actress, musician and model.

Early life and family
Wyatt was born in Dublin, Ireland, the daughter of musician Enda Wyatt of Irish rock band An Emotional Fish. She was raised in Tallaght in south Dublin.

She studied technical stage training and worked as a freelance stage manager for four years in Irish theatres and a Parisian circus.

In 2004, Kojii met her husband, fine-art photographer Cyril Helnwein when she posed for his "Ethereal" series. Cyril Helnwein is the eldest son of Austrian artist Gottfried Helnwein. On the winter solstice, 21 December 2005, their first daughter Croí Sequoia Helnwein was born. On 7 April 2011, she gave birth to their second daughter Éala Cheyenne. On 25 August 2013, she gave birth to their son Captain Solas Wyatt Helnwein.

Acting
Kojii studied acting in Los Angeles at the Acting Center and at the Irish Film Academy in Ireland.

Performances have included:
 Urban Traffik (pre-production)
 The O'Brien's, 2013
 The World Ends Without You (short), 2010
 Terra Incognita (2010), with Juliette Lewis and Michael Des Barres

Modelling
Helnwein was engaged by Rebecca Morgan of Morgan the Agency in Ireland.

After her first modelling job for John Rocha Helnwein began working full-time in print, runway, and commercial modelling.

She has been seen in numerous magazines, including, Fit Pregnancy, Women's Wear Daily, Cosmopolitan, Elle, BPM, Prudence, Tatler and Vogue. She has appeared in adverts and catalogues for companies such as, O.P.I., Got2b, Louis Verdad, Ed Hardy, Coca-Cola, Toni and Guy and Gap.

Helnwein appears in national advertisements in the United States for clients such as Target, Mitsubishi, Comcast, Marshalls and in Ireland for clients such as O2, Pigsback and TV3. She has also become known in Ireland for a long-standing appearance in a TV3 ident where she is featured singing the networks jingle.

Helnwein's runway clients have included Prada, Jimmy Choo, Jeffrey Sebelia, Eduardo Lucero, A-Wear, Smet, GenArt and Whitley Kros to name just a few.

Helnwein appeared on Project Runway (Season 6) and the companion show Models of the Runway (Season 1). This show aired on Lifetime TV 20 August 2009. Kojii has also been regularly seen on RTÉ's Off The Rails, Late Late Show, and Live at 3, and TV3's Ireland AM

Music
In 2006 Helnwein started touring with her band, also known as Kojii in Ireland. She sings, writes music and lyrics, and plays guitar.  The same year she recorded and released a self-titled album, Kojii.

References

External links

Kojii Music
Kojii music on Discogs
Lifetime's "Models of the Runway" profile of Kojii Helnwein

Actresses from Dublin (city)
People from Tallaght
Musicians from Dublin (city)
Irish female models
Irish guitarists
Living people
21st-century Irish actresses
1981 births
21st-century guitarists
21st-century male musicians
Models from Dublin (city)
21st-century women guitarists